Native Foods is a fast-casual vegan restaurant chain that operates in California, Oregon, Colorado, and Illinois. The first Native Foods opened as "Native Foods Cafe" in 1994 in Palm Springs, California by Tanya Petrovna. In 2009, the brand was acquired by Daniel Dolan and Andrea McGinty, who relocated the company to Chicago.

See also 
 List of vegetarian restaurants
 Veganism

References

External links

Fast-food chains of the United States
Restaurants established in 1994
Companies based in Chicago
Vegan restaurants in the United States
1994 establishments in California